Reverend Cleavant Derricks (May 13, 1910 in Chattanooga, Tennessee – April 14, 1977) was a pastor and choir director at a number of black Baptist churches.

He studied at Cadek Conservatory of Music in Chattanooga, A & I State University and American Baptist Theological Seminary in Nashville. At age 21, he directed a gospel choir of more than 100 voices in Washington, D.C. at the Vermont Avenue Baptist Church. Cleavant Derricks counted among his friends many well-known artists, one of which was Mahalia Jackson. He pastored churches throughout Tennessee at Dayton, Knoxville and Jackson; also in Beloit, Wisconsin and Washington, D.C. Mr. Derricks has many outstanding credits: pastor, church builder, choir director, poet, musician, and composer of note, having written more than 300 songs and several song books. Among his more famous songs are the much-recorded and performed "Just a Little Talk with Jesus," "When God Dipped His Love In My Heart," "We'll Soon Be Done With Troubles and Trials," and "When He Blessed My Soul." He was inducted into the Gospel Music Hall of Fame in 1984.  He is the father of twin actor sons Cleavant Derricks and Clinton Derricks-Carroll.

References

1910 births
1977 deaths
African-American songwriters
Gospel music composers
20th-century American composers
20th-century African-American musicians